Disk-O-Tek Holiday is a 1966 American-British film. It was originally a 1964 British film called Just For You, directed by Douglas Hickox and starring Sam Costa, which was recut and re-edited with American numbers added.

Original Cast
Sam Costa
Freddie and the Dreamers
Jackie and the Raindrops
Peter and Gordon
The Bachelors
The Merseybeats
The Applejacks
Mark Wynter
Louise Cordet
Millie Small
A Band of Angels
Doug Sheldon
Al Saxon
The Orchids
Johnny B. Great
The Warriors
Judy Jason
Caroline Lee

References

External links
Disk-O-Tek Holiday at IMDb
Disk-O-Tek Holiday at TCMDB

1966 films